Heaven, We Inherit a Castle is a 1943 German comedy film directed by Peter Paul Brauer and starring Anny Ondra, Hans Brausewetter, and Carla Rust. The film was shot in German-occupied Prague, Ondra's hometown, by the Prag-Film company using the Hostivar Studios. It was Ondra's last starring role.

The film is based on Hans Fallada's novel Kleiner Mann - großer Mann, alles vertauscht.

Cast

References

Bibliography

External links 
 

1943 films
Films of Nazi Germany
German comedy films
1943 comedy films
1940s German-language films
Films directed by Peter Paul Brauer
Films based on German novels
German black-and-white films
1940s German films
Adaptations of works by Hans Fallada